Gwinnett Ballet Theatre is a nonprofit dance organization and school located in Lawrenceville, Gwinnett County, Georgia (Atlanta vicinity). The artistic director is Wade Walthall, and the music director and conductor is Predrag Gosta. The founding director is Lynne Snipes. GBT was under the Artistic Direction of Lisa Sheppard Robson from 1997-2011.

As Gwinnett County’s first and oldest nonprofit performing arts organization, GBT was founded in 1977, and since then it also exists as a school that provides training to those interested to pursue a professional dancing career.

Notable productions 

 The Nutcracker
 Alice in Wonderland
 Stravinsky's The Firebird
 Mendelssohn's A Midsummer Night's Dream
 Cinderella
 Journey - an original ballet by Wade Walthall
 Giselle
 Bits and Pieces 
 Disney...Songs and Pictures
 Friends and Famous Dances

External links 
  
 
 
 GBT MySpace page
 
 GBT YouTube page

Ballet companies in the United States
Theatre in Atlanta
1977 establishments in Georgia (U.S. state)
Performing groups established in 1977
Tourist attractions in Gwinnett County, Georgia
Dance in Georgia (U.S. state)